Muži v offsidu is a 1931 Czechoslovak sports comedy film directed by Svatopluk Innemann, based on a novel by Karel Poláček.

Production
Karel Poláček's comedic novel was a bestseller in Czechoslovakia. The movie was made only because there was an open timeslot with no production planned in Barrandov studios that needed to be filled. Director Innemann read the book and the screenplay was finished just a week later. Josef Rovenský was considered for the role of Načeradec, but Poláček insisted his friend Hugo Haas should play the part.

Cast
Hugo Haas as Richard Načeradec
Jožka Vanerová as Hedvika Načeradcová
Felix Kühne as Uncle Ignác Kauders
Jindřich Plachta as Tailor Emanuel Habásko
Eman Fiala as Eman Habásek
Betty Kysilková as Widow Ouholičková
Theodor Pištěk as Barber Alois Šefelín
Ella Nollová as Šefelín's wife
Jiřina Štěpničková as Seamstress Emilka Šefelínová
Jaroslav Vojta as Antonín Hátle
Růžena Šlemrová as Fashion salon owner Šmalfusová

Reception
The film was commercially very successful. It was the third most attended film of 1931 in Czechoslovakia after Karel Lamač's Business Under Distress and Ernst Lubitsch's The Smiling Lieutenant. It made Hugo Hass a star overnight.

Sequel
In 1932 a sequel Načeradec, král kibiců was made by Gustav Machatý.

References

External links
 

1931 films
Czech sports comedy films
Czechoslovak black-and-white films
1930s sports comedy films
Czech association football films
1931 comedy films
1930s Czech-language films
1930s Czech films